5th World Soundtrack Awards
October 15, 2005

Best Original Soundtrack:
 War of the Worlds
The 5th World Soundtrack Awards were given on 15 October 2005 in the Bijloke Concert Hall, Ghent, Belgium.

Winners
Best Soundtrack Composer of the Year:
Angelo Badalamenti - Un long dimanche de fiançailles (A Very Long Engagement)
Best Original Soundtrack of the Year:
War of the Worlds - John Williams
Best Original Song Written for a Film:
"Old Habits Die Hard" - Alfie 
Performed by Mick Jagger
Lyrics by Dave Stewart and Mick Jagger
Public Choice Award:
Alexander - Vangelis
Discovery of the Year
Michael Giacchino - The Incredibles
Lifetime Achievement Award:
Jerry Leiber and Mike Stoller

Nominees
Best Soundtrack Composer of the Year:
Thomas Newman - Lemony Snicket
John Powell - The Bourne Supremacy
Howard Shore - The Aviator
John Williams - War of the Worlds
Best Original Soundtrack of the Year:
The Aviator - Howard Shore 
Batman Begins - James Newton Howard and Hans Zimmer 
The Bourne Supremacy - John Powell 
Mar adentro (Sea Inside) - Alejandro Amenábar 
Best Original Song Written for a Film:
"Al otro lado del río" - Diarios de motocicleta (The Motorcycle Diaries)
Performed by Jorge Drexler
Lyrics by Jorge Drexler
"Believe" - The Polar Express
Composed by Alan Silvestri
Performed by Josh Groban
Lyrics by Glen Ballard
"Learn to Be Lonely" - The Phantom of the Opera
Composed by Andrew Lloyd Webber
Performed by Minnie Driver
Lyrics by Charles Hart
"Million Voices" - Hotel Rwanda
Composed by Andrea Guerra
Performed by Wyclef Jean
Lyrics by Wyclef Jean and Jerry Duplessis
Discovery of the Year:
Ilan Eshkeri - Layer Cake
Andrés Goldstein and Daniel Tarrab - Deuda
Cyril Morin - The Syrian Bride
Benjamin Wallfish - Dear Wendy

References 

0
2005 film awards